Fossingfjord is a fjord on the border between the municipalities of Kragerø and Bamble in Telemark county, Norway.

References

Kragerø
Bamble
Fjords of Vestfold og Telemark